Lunde Station is located in Lunde in Nome, Norway on the Sørlandet Line. The station is served by express trains to Kristiansand.

History
The station was opened in 1925 when the Sørlandet Line was opened to Lunde, and was the terminal station until Kragerø Station opened in 1927.

External links 
 Entry by Jernbaneverket 

Railway stations on the Sørlandet Line
Railway stations in Vestfold og Telemark
Railway stations opened in 1925
1925 establishments in Norway
Nome, Norway